Jason Toop Cooper (born 31 January 1967) is an English drummer best known for his work with The Cure.

Life and work

Born in London, England, Jason studied drums at London's Drumtech (where he is now a patron and visiting artist). He first came to public attention as drummer for the band My Life Story. Jason joined The Cure in 1995 following the 1993 departure of their previous drummer Boris Williams. So far, he has performed on the studio albums Wild Mood Swings, Bloodflowers, The Cure and 4:13 Dream. He also appeared in three concert films, Trilogy, Festival 2005 and Anniversary 2018. In March of 2020 he planned a 3 city tour but was later canceled by Covid-19 

Jason also composes music for film, most notably co-creating the score for the horror/thriller From Within, for which he and co-composer Oliver Kraus won the award for Best Original Score at the 2008 Solstice Film Festival.  

On 15 May 2004, Jason married his long-time girlfriend Allison.

Discography with The Cure
 Wild Mood Swings (1996)
 Galore (1997)
 Bloodflowers (2000)
 Greatest Hits (2001)
 Trilogy (2003), DVD
 The Cure (2004)
 Festival 2005 (2005), DVD
 4:13 Dream (2008)
 Bestival Live 2011 (2011)
 40 Live Curaetion 25 + Anniversary (2018)DVD/BluRay

References

1967 births
Living people
The Cure members
English rock drummers
British male drummers
Musicians from London